The Catholic Church in Zimbabwe is part of the worldwide Catholic Church, under the spiritual leadership of the Pope in Rome.

There were 1,145,000 Catholics in the country (about 9% of the total population) in 2005. There are eight dioceses, including two archdioceses.  Pius Ncube, the former archbishop of Bulawayo, was an outspoken critic of the then government of Robert Mugabe, who is also a Catholic.

Dioceses
Harare
 Chinhoyi
 Gokwe
 Mutare
Bulawayo
 Gweru
 Hwange
 Masvingo

See also
 Roman Catholic Archdiocese of Bulawayo
List of parishes in the Archdiocese of Harare
 Religion in Zimbabwe
 Archbishop Marek Zalewski

References

External links
Statistics relating to the Catholic church in Zimbabwe
GCatholic
Zimbabwe Catholic Bishops' Conference

 
Zimbabwe
Zimbabwe